The 2004 Limerick Senior Hurling Championship was the 110th staging of the Limerick Senior Hurling Championship since its establishment by the Limerick County Board in 1887.

Patrickswell were the defending champions.

On 10 October 2004, Ahane won the championship after a 1-11 to 0-13 defeat of Garryspillane in the final. It was their 19th championship title overall and their first title since 1999. It remains their last championship triumph.

Results

Final

References

Limerick Senior Hurling Championship
Limerick Senior Hurling Championship